The Canadian Society of Petroleum Geologists (CSPG) is a professional geological society in Canada. The CSPG works to advance the science of geology, foster professional development of members and promote community awareness of the profession.  The organization was founded on December 17, 1927 as the Alberta Society of Petroleum Geologists in Calgary and was modelled after the American Association of Petroleum Geologists. It is based in Calgary, Alberta.

History
The society was founded in 1927 in Calgary, and was affiliated to the American Association of Petroleum Geologists on 1930. In the 1950s, the Saskatchewan Geological Society and the Edmonton Geological Society were affiliated to the ASPG.

the organisation was renamed to Canadian Association of Petroleum Geologists in 1969, when it merged with the Saskatchewan Geological Society and the Edmonton Geological Society.

Publications
The society published a Journal of Canadian Petroleum Geology, renamed in 1963 to Bulletin of Canadian Petroleum Geology. Another publication, the Geological History of Western Canada became the main reference for stratigraphy of Canadian geological units.

The society published the Atlas of Western Canada in 1964. It was edited by R.G. McCrossan and R.P. Glaister, and contained detailed references to the Geological History of Western Canada and the stratigraphy of the Western Canadian Sedimentary Basin.

The Reservoir
The past president of the Canadian Society of Petroleum Geologists, Neill A. Hutton published a series in the Society's The Reservoir in 2009 entitled Climate Change..

See also
List of geoscience organizations

References

External links
Canadian Society of Petroleum Geologists

Petroleum geology
Economic geology
Geology societies
Geology of Canada
Scientific societies based in Canada
1927 establishments in Alberta
Scientific organizations established in 1927